Sir Charles Arthur Lovatt Evans  (8 July 1884 - 29 August 1968) was a British physiologist who was vice-president of the Royal Society.

Charles Arthur Lovatt Evans was born in Birmingham, the son of Charles Evans, a piano and violin teacher.

Education
Evans attended the Birmingham Municipal Technical School, and then sat as an external candidate for the University of London B.Sc. Immediately after the examination in 1911 he was appointed a Sharpey Scholar in the Physiology Department of University College,  sponsored by Professor Ernest Starling.

He subsequently received  M.R.C.S.,  L.R.C.P degrees  from University College Hospital, in 1916. He  then joined the Royal Army Medical Corps,  and supervised anti-gas training in several units.

Scientific career

Honours
In 1911, he  became a member of the Physiological Society and of the just-formed Biochemical Society. He was knighted in 1951.

References

1884 births
1968 deaths
Fellows of the Royal Society
British physiologists
Jodrell Professors of Physiology